Daniel Salvatierra (born 23 February 1990) is an Argentine football central forward currently playing for Sporivo Las Parejas.

Club career
Salvatierra made his professional debut for Newell's in December 2010 against Liga de Quito. At the end of the season, he was released and joined Atlético Tucumán in Primera B Nacional. In 2013, he signed for Coronel Aguirre, but he was released in 2014. In 2015, he joined Tiro Federal playing in the Torneo Federal A, but his club was relegated. He was transferred to Unión de Sunchales in 2016.

External links
 
 
 Daniel Salvatierra at BDFA

1990 births
Living people
Argentine footballers
Argentine people of Italian descent
Association football midfielders
Footballers from Rosario, Santa Fe
Atlético Tucumán footballers
Newell's Old Boys footballers
Tiro Federal footballers
Unión de Sunchales footballers
Argentine Primera División players
Primera Nacional players